was a Japanese actress, voice actress, narrator and singer from Ama District, Aichi. Throughout her career, she worked with Production Baobab, and was working with Aoni Production at the time of her death. Mizutani was best known for her anime voice roles of Sakiko Sakura in Chibi Maruko-chan, Mihoshi Kuramitsu in Tenchi Muyo! and Pinoko in Black Jack. She also portrayed Excellen Browning in Super Robot Wars, Sora Takenouchi in Digimon Adventure, Leina Stol in Machine Robo: Revenge of Cronos, and Sarah Zabiarov and Cheimin Noa in Mobile Suit Zeta Gundam. Mizutani was the official Japanese voice actress for Minnie Mouse, and voiced her in the Kingdom Hearts franchise.

Since her death, Aya Endō took over as the new Japanese voice of Minnie Mouse.

Machiko Toyoshima took over as Sakiko Sakura as replacement in Chibi Maruko-chan.

Career
After graduating from the Institute for Youth Theater in 1985, Mizutani was signed to the Seinenza Theater Company's talent agency until 1989. She debuted in 1985 as an airfield announcer for Mobile Suit Zeta Gundam while appearing on television in TV dramas. After playing the role of Sarah Zabiarov in Mobile Suit Zeta Gundam, her portrayals of Leina Stol in Machine Robo: Revenge of Cronos and Apple in Zillion were highly praised and her popularity grew. In 1988, she starred as Hiromi Oka in Aim for the Ace! 2.

Since 1991, Mizutani had been the official voice of Disney's Minnie Mouse. In addition to animation and video games at the Tokyo Disney Resort, she also appeared as Minnie Mouse in attractions, shows, and parades.

She voiced the role of Sakiko Sakura in the anime series Chibi Maruko-chan from 1990 until her death.

In 1993 she voiced Pinoko, Black Jack's loyal assistant/adopted daughter, in Osamu Tezuka's Black Jack OVA. She reprised the role in an anime series from 2004 to 2011.

Mizutani was cast from 1995 to 1997 as Galaxy Police detective Mihoshi Kuramitsu in Tenchi Muyo!.

Personal life
In November 1994, she married Mizuho Nishikubo.

Death
On May 17, 2016, Mizutani died from breast cancer at the age of 51.

Filmography

Anime television
Mobile Suit Zeta Gundam (1985–1986) – Sarah Zabiarov and Cheimin Noa
Dirty Pair (1985) – Security Guard, Creamy Girl
Machine Robo: Revenge of Cronos (1986–1987) – Leina Stōl
Mobile Suit Gundam ZZ (1986–1987) – Milly Childer
Zillion (1987–1987) – Apple
City Hunter (1987–1988) – Yoshimi Iwai
Esper Mami (1987–1989) – Midori
Tenkū Senki Shurato (1989–1990) – Lakshu of Kisshō Ten, Hōraisan
Idol Densetsu Eriko (1989–1990) – Kaori Yamaguchi, Catherine, Reporter
Idol Angel Yokoso Yoko (1990) – Kyoko Hoshihana
Oishinbo (1990) – Kimiko Oide
Yawara! (1990–1992) – Anna Teleshikova
Nadia: The Secret of Blue Water (1990–1991) – Marie
Kyatto Ninden Teyandee (1990–1991) – Omitsu
Brave Exkaiser (1990) – Kumiko Morita
Momotaro Densetsu (1990–1991) – Princess Kaguya (Second)
Chibi Maruko-chan (1990–2016) – Sakiko Sakura, Keiko Uchida, Wakabayashi, Nagasawa's Mother, Yamane's Mother, Hiroshi Sakura (young)
Jankenman (1991) – Aikko
Ashita e Free Kick (1992) – Alyssa Montino
Boyfriend (1992) – Aki Togawa
Floral Magician Mary Bell (1992) – Paula
Tekkaman Blade (1992) – Miyuki Aiba/Tekkaman Rapier, Noal's mother
Tonde Burin (1994–1995) – Rikako Kokubu
Mobile Fighter G Gundam (1994–1995) – Black Joker
Tico of the Seven Seas (1994–1995) – Cheryl Christina Melville
Chō Kuse ni Narisō (1994–1995) – Sayaka Seijo
Haō Taikei Ryū Knight (1994–1995) – Iori
Dino Adventure Jurassic Tripper (1995) – Princess
Tenchi Universe (1995) – Mihoshi Kuramitsu
Sorcerer Hunters (1995–1996) – Chocolate Misu
Soar High! Isami (1995–1996) – Jasmine
Shadow Skill (1995–2004) – Fouly
Kiko-chan's Smile (1996) – Megumi-Sensei
Magical Girl Pretty Sammy (1996) – Mihoshi Mizutani
After War Gundam X (1996) – Carris Nautilus
Martian Successor Nadesico (1996–1997) – Aqua Crimson
Brave Command Dagwon (1996–1997) – Erika Serizawa
Saber Marionette J (1996–1997) – Luchs
Tenchi in Tokyo (1997) – Mihoshi Kuramitsu
Gakkyu-Oh Yamazaki (1997–1998) – Memeko-Sensei, Nakamoto
Weiss Kreuz (1998) – Tot
The Kindaichi Case Files (1998) – Satsuki Munakata
Saber Marionette J to X (1998–1999) – Luchs
Digimon Adventure (1999–2000) – Sora Takenouchi
Excel Saga (1999–2000) – The Great Will of the Macrocosm
Inuyasha (2000) – Sōten
Detective Conan (2000) – Shinobu Shimon
Digimon Adventure 02 (2000–2001) – Sora Takenouchi
Go! Go! Itsutsugo Land (2001–2002) – Kinoko Morino
The Family's Defensive Alliance (2001) – Junko Ejima
Hoshi no Kirby (2001–2003) – Memu (Lady Like), Waddle Doo (Third), Mabel, Coo, Chilly, Walky, and Devil Frog
Someday's Dreamers (2003) – Sachiko
Cinderella Boy (2003) – Kei
Zatch Bell! (2003–2006) – Sisters
Yu-Gi-Oh! Duel Monsters GX (2004–2008) – Sara
Black Jack (2004–2006) – Pinoko
The Snow Queen (2005) – Claus
Kashimashi: Girl Meets Girl (2006) – Namiko Tsuki
Super Robot Wars Original Generation: Divine Wars (2006–2007) – Excellen Browning
Shiki (2010) – Kyōko Ozaki, Atsuko Yasumori
Notari Matsutarō (2014) – Reiko Minami
Ai Tenchi Muyo! (2014) – Mihoshi
Pretty Guardian Sailor Moon Crystal (2014–2016) – Ikuko Tsukino
The Rolling Girls (2015) – Aya Suzumoto

OVA
Bubblegum Crisis (1987–1991 OVA series) – Anri
Space Family Carlvinson (1988) – Beruka
Leina series (1988) – Leina Stōl
Aim for the Ace! (1988–1989 OVA series) – Hiromi Oka
Bio-Booster Armor Guyver (1989–1992 OVA series) – Mizuki Segawa
Angel Cop (1989–1994) – Freya
Blood Reign: Curse of the Yoma (1989) – Kotone
3×3 Eyes (1991) – Natsuko Asai
Eternal Filena (1992) – Lila
Tenchi Muyo! Ryo-Ohki (1992) – Mihoshi Kuramitsu
Black Jack (1993–2011) – Pinoko
KO Beast (1992) – V-Sion
Idol Defense Force Hummingbird (1993–1995) – Hitomi Nakajo
Magical Girl Pretty Sammy (1995) – Mihoshi Mizutani
Eternal Family (1997) – Akiko
Hyper Speed GranDoll (1997) – Miki Amagi
Super Robot Wars Original Generation: The Animation (2005) – Excellen Browning 
Eve no jikan (2008–2009 ONA) – Naoko
A Channel (2012) – Run's Mother
Ranma ½ OVA's – Kurumi

Video games
Flash Hiders (1993) – Harman Do Elan
Puyo Puyo CD (1994) – Draco Centauros, Sukiyapodes
Battle Tycoon: Flash Hiders SFX (1995) – Harman Do Elan
Dōkyūsei (1995) – Hiromi Tamachi
Puyo Puyo CD Tsu (1996) – Draco Centauros
Langrisser III (1996) – Sophia
Kid Klown no Crazy Chase 2: Love Love Honey Soudatsusen (1996) – Princess Honey
Silhouette Mirage (1997) – Sophial SP
Bulk Slash (1997) – Colon Steiner
Rockman X4 (1997) – Iris
YAKATA (1998) – Miruko Kawaguchi
Magical Drop F (1999) – Justice & High Priestess
Growlanser (1999) – Karene Langley
Puyo Puyo~n (1999) – Witch
Super Robot Wars Impact (2002) – Excellen Browning & Alfimi 
Kingdom Hearts series (2002-2016) – Minnie Mouse
Growlanser II: The Sense of Justice (2004) – Karene Langley
Namco × Capcom (2005) – Toby Masuyo, Katana & 99
Super Robot Wars Original Generations (2007) – Excellen & Lemon Browning; and Alfimi 
Super Robot Wars Original Generation Gaiden (2007) – Excellen Browning & Alfimi
Super Robot Wars OG Saga: Endless Frontier EXCEED (2008) – Alfimi, Katana & Byakuya
Project X Zone (2012) – Iris, Katana, Akatana & Byakuya X
Project X Zone 2 (2015) – Katana, Akatana & Byakuya X

Films
My Neighbor Totoro (1988) – Ryoko-chan
Doraemon: The Record of Nobita's Parallel Visit to the West (1988) (Linlei)
Eiji (1990) – Marina Takasugi
Crayon Shin-chan: Unkokusai's Ambition (1995) – Yukino
Tenchi Muyo in Love! (1996) – Mihoshi Kuramitsu
Dead Leaves (2004) – Galactica
Doraemon: Nobita in the Wan-Nyan Spacetime Odyssey (2004) (Zubu)
Dōbutsu no Mori (2006) – Perimi/Phyllis
Detective Conan: Full Score of Fear (2008) – Rara Chigusa
Time of Eve: The Movie (2010) – Naoko Sakisaka

Dubbing

Live-action
Sarah Michelle Gellar roles
Buffy the Vampire Slayer – Buffy Summers 
Possession – Jess
The Grudge – Karen Davis
The Grudge 2 – Karen Davis
Southland Tales – Krysta Now
Meg Ryan roles
Sleepless in Seattle – Annie Reed
You've Got Mail – Kathleen "Shopgirl" Kelly
8 Million Ways to Die – Sunny (Alexandra Paul)
Army of Darkness – Sheila (Embeth Davidtz)
Bad Santa – Sue (Lauren Graham)
Beverly Hills, 90210 – Andrea Zuckerman (Gabrielle Carteris)
Beyond the Poseidon Adventure – Theresa Mazzetti (Angela Cartwright)
Bound – Violet (Jennifer Tilly)
The Arrival – Char (Teri Polo)
Career Opportunities – Josie McClellan (Jennifer Connelly)
Casualties of War – Tran Thi Oanh (Thuy Thu Le)
Cliffhanger – Sarah (Michelle Joyner)
Color of Night – Sondra Dorio (Lesley Ann Warren)
The Distinguished Gentleman – Celia Kirby (Victoria Rowell)
Doc Hollywood – Vialula "Lou" (Julie Warner)
Dr. Jekyll and Ms. Hyde – Sarah Carver (Lysette Anthony)
Emily Brontë's Wuthering Heights – Isabella Linton (Sophie Ward)
Escape from L.A. – Taslima (Valeria Golino)
Everyone Says I Love You – Skylar Dandridge (Drew Barrymore)
Friday the 13th Part VIII: Jason Takes Manhattan – Rennie Wickham (Jensen Daggett)
The Golden Child (1992 TV Asahi edition) – Kee Nang (Charlotte Lewis)
Highlander III: The Sorcerer – Dr. Alexandra Johnson/Sarah Barrington (Deborah Kara Unger)
Hollow Man – Sarah Kennedy (Kim Dickens)
Home Alone – Heather McCallister (Kristin Minter)
Home Alone 2: Lost in New York – Tracy McCallister (Senta Moses)
Iron Eagle – Amy (Kathy Wagner)
Jumanji – Judy Shepherd (Kirsten Dunst)
King Kong – Dwan (Jessica Lange)
Kiss of Death – Rosie Kilmartin (Kathryn Erbe)
Knock Off – Karen Lee (Lela Rochon)
Last Action Hero – Whitney Slater/Meredith Caprice (Bridgette Wilson)
The Last Boy Scout – Cory (Halle Berry)
A Nightmare on Elm Street – Tina Gray (Amanda Wyss)
NYPD Blue – Robin Wirkus (Debrah Farentino)
Pale Rider – Megan Wheeler (Sydney Penny)
The Pink Panther – Princess Dala (Gale Garnett)
Poison Ivy: The New Seduction – Violet (Jaime Pressly)
Practical Magic – Kylie Owens (Evan Rachel Wood)
Return of the Living Dead Part II – Lucy Wilson (Marsha Dietlein)
Romy and Michele's High School Reunion – Christie Masters (Julia Campbell)
Scooby-Doo 2: Monsters Unleashed – Heather Jasper-Howe (Alicia Silverstone)
She-Wolf of London – Randi Wallace (Kate Hodge)
Short Circuit 2 – Sandy Banatoni (Cynthia Gibb)
Sibling Rivalry – Jeanine (Jami Gertz)
Single White Female – Hedra "Hedy" Carlson/Ellen Besch (Jennifer Jason Leigh)
Sleepers – Carol (Minnie Driver)
Stargate SG-1 – Hathor (Suanne Braun)
Three Men and a Baby – Sally (Barbara Budd)
True Lies – Dana Tasker (Eliza Dushku)
Vampire in Brooklyn – Det. Rita Veder (Angela Bassett)
Waitress – Dawn (Adrienne Shelly)
Will & Grace – Ellen (Leigh-Allyn Baker)

Animation
Balto – Rosy
Disney's House of Mouse – Minnie Mouse
Hercules – Terpsichore
The Mask: Animated Series – Peggy Brandt
Mickey, Donald, Goofy: The Three Musketeers – Minnie Mouse
Peanuts – Pig-Pen, Violet Gray
Tiny Toon Adventures – Sweetie Pie

Drama CDs
Analyst no Yuutsu series 1: Benchmark ni Koi wo Shite – Chizuru Mizusawa

References

External links
Official agency profile 

1964 births
2016 deaths
Aoni Production voice actors
Japanese sopranos
Japanese video game actresses
Japanese voice actresses
Musicians from Aichi Prefecture
Production Baobab voice actors
Voice actresses from Aichi Prefecture
20th-century Japanese actresses
21st-century Japanese actresses
20th-century Japanese women singers
20th-century Japanese singers
21st-century Japanese women singers
21st-century Japanese singers
Deaths from cancer in Japan
Deaths from breast cancer